A by-election was held for the New South Wales Legislative Assembly electorate of Burwood on 16 February 1957 because of the death of Leslie Parr.

Dates

Result

Leslie Parr died.

See also
Electoral results for the district of Burwood (New South Wales)
List of New South Wales state by-elections

References

1957 elections in Australia
New South Wales state by-elections
1950s in New South Wales